Moussa Dadis Camara (born 1964 or 1968), Military Guinean president in 2009 following a coup d'état
 Moussa Camara (athlete) (born 1988), Malian middle-distance runner
 Moussa Camara (defender), Guinean footballer
 Moussa Camara (goalkeeper) (born 1998), Guinean footballer

See also
 Moussa Kamara (born 1999), Gambian footballer